The United Nations Educational, Scientific and Cultural Organization (UNESCO) World Heritage Sites are places of importance to cultural or natural heritage as described in the UNESCO World Heritage Convention, established in 1972. Cultural heritage consists of monuments (such as architectural works, monumental sculptures, or inscriptions), groups of buildings, and sites (including archaeological sites). Natural features (consisting of physical and biological formations), geological and physiographical formations (including habitats of threatened species of animals and plants), and natural sites which are important from the point of view of science, conservation or natural beauty, are defined as natural heritage.  The Kingdom of Belgium accepted the convention on 24 July 1996, making its historical sites eligible for inclusion on the list.

, there are 15 sites in Belgium inscribed on the list. The first sites in Belgium to be added to the list were the Flemish Béguinages, the Grand-Place in Brussels and the lifts on the Canal du Centre, at the 22nd UNESCO session in 1998. The most recent inscriptions were the Colonies of Benevolence, a transnational site shared with the Netherlands, and the Great Spa Towns of Europe, shared with six other countries. The Sonian Forest, part of the 18-country site of the Ancient and Primeval Beech Forests of the Carpathians and Other Regions of Europe, is the only natural site in Belgium; the others are cultural sites, as determined by UNESCO's selection criteria. Belgium's five transnational sites also include the Belfries of Belgium and France, shared with France, and the  Architectural Work of Le Corbusier, shared with six other countries. In addition, Belgium has 16 sites on its tentative list.


World Heritage Sites 
UNESCO lists sites under ten criteria; each entry must meet at least one of the criteria. Criteria i through vi are cultural, and vii through x are natural.

Tentative list 
In addition to the sites inscribed on the World Heritage list, member states can maintain a list of tentative sites that they may consider for nomination. Nominations for the World Heritage list are only accepted if the site was previously listed on the tentative list. As of 2019, Belgium lists 18 properties on its tentative list.

See also 
 Heritage registers in Belgium
 UNESCO Intangible Cultural Heritage Lists

References

External links 
 World Heritage List
 UNESCO's official list of sites in Belgium

 
Belgium
World Heritage Sites
World Heritage Sites
World Heritage Sites
World Heritage Sites